Conant Valley is a valley between Duncan Bluff and Communication Heights in the southern part of the Darwin Mountains; the valley mouth opens to Hatherton Glacier. It was named after Neil Conant, communications operator in support of the United States Antarctic Program in 15 austral summers, 1984–2001; three summers were at Siple Station in the 1980s, the remainder at South Pole Station.

References
 

Valleys of Oates Land